Dushi, also spelled Doshi or Dowshi, is a town in Dushi District, Baghlan Province, Afghanistan.  It is the administrative center of Dushi District and is located on the major  Kabul-Kunduz highway.

See also 
 Dushi District
 Baghlan Province

External links 
 Map showing Dushi AIMS Afghanistan Topographic Map Sheet #PI42-02

Populated places in Baghlan Province